Saint Eleutherius may refer to: 

Pope Eleutherius (feast day: May 26), 2nd-century pope
Eleutherius of Rocca d'Arce (feast day: May 29), 12th-century English pilgrim who died at Rocca d'Arce
Eleutherius of Nicomedia (feast day: October 2), 4th-century soldier who was martyred under Diocletian
Eleutherius of Auxerre (feast day: August 26), 6th-century bishop of Auxerre
Eleutherius of Tournai (feast day: February 20) 6th-century bishop of Tournai
Eleutherius and Antia (feast day: died 121)
the martyred companion of Saint Denis of Paris (martyred c.250, feast day: October 9)

See also
Eleutherius (disambiguation)